Zheng Junli (December 6, 1911 – April 23, 1969) was a Chinese actor and director born in Shanghai and who rose to prominence in the golden age of Chinese Cinema. His films The Spring River Flows East and Crows and Sparrows are widely considered classics of Chinese cinema. He was severely persecuted during the Cultural Revolution and died in prison.

Republic of China
Zheng was born into an impoverished family, often harassed by creditors. At early ages, he showed great interest in reading and art performing. He left junior high at second grade and entered "Nanguo Art School" led by Tian Han and studied play acting.

During the 1930s, Zheng was an actor under contract with Lianhua Film Company. While with Lianhua, he played a number of roles, notably as the love-interest Yu Haichou in the film New Women opposite Ruan Lingyu.

After the Sino-Japanese War Zheng began to focus his efforts on directing, most notably with The Spring River Flows East (co-directed with Cai Chusheng) (1947) and his anti-Kuomintang polemic Crows and Sparrows (1948). In 1957, the latter was awarded Excellent Movie Award first-class (1949-1955) by the Minister of Culture of the PRC.

People's Republic of China
Zheng welcomed the establishment of the new government of CPC. As a left-wing director, he was at first one of the beneficiaries. He moved his family from a dilapidated dormitory in Kunlun Studio to the best residential area in Shanghai, opposite the house of Soong Ching-ling.

On 2nd meeting of CPC 7th national congress, Mao Zedong mentioned some issues of CPC cadres after entering the cities. Zheng immediately followed the directive and made the movie The Married Couple, starring Zhao Dan and Jiang Tianliu. It told a story of a CPC cadre ditching his original wife in his village in order to marry a girl in the city, showing his failure to resist the temptation of "sugar-coated bullet". This movie was banned even before the public release.

Zheng was a member of Art Commission of Shanghai Film Studio and used to support the making of The Life of Wu Xun. This movie was severely excoriated by CPC authority and Zheng felt guilty about that. His former production, The Married Couple, was also criticized at this time, which exerted great pressure on the director.

In order to criticize The Life of Wu Xun, Jiang Qing and her followers went to Shandong to do research. They found another historical figure, Song Jingshi, a peasant uprising leader of the "Black Flag Army". They thus erected Song and Black Flag Army as revolutionary examples to further denounce Wu Xun. However, a dilemma was encountered by Zheng and Sun Yu during the writing of the script. In the real history, Song Jingshi eventually surrendered to Qing Dynasty; but for political purpose, Song had to be depicted as a determined revolutionary. A compromise was finally reached with Song's surrender being shown as a mere tactical move in the film. 
Due to the critical stance of The Life of Wu Xun, Shanghai Film Studio hoped Song Jingshi would redeem its "political mistakes". The then vice director of the movie bureau, Cui Wei, even acted as Song Jingshi himself; other famed actors and actresses were all willing to perform minor supporting roles. But Song being shown as surrendering to the Qing authority in any way was not well-received and the movie was only allowed to be released for a short period after four to five years after its completion. In the end, the film that was meant as an "atonement" got banned.

After continuous lack of success, Zheng's next two biographical pictures on Nie Er and Lin Zexu (both starring Zhao Dan) won wide acclaim, and alleviated his feeling of guilt.

Zheng was severely persecuted during the Cultural Revolution, and died in prison in 1969.

He was a delegate to Shanghai municipal People's Congress, a member of 3rd and 4th CPPCC, a councilman of China Film Association, China Playwrights Association and Shanghai Film Association.

Film theory
Zheng was devoted to translating and writing works on films and plays. So far his published works include The Birth of a Role and Voice-over, among others.

He thought his performance was rigid and not satisfactory. Thus he made great efforts to study performing theories. He first tried to translate Acting: The First Six Lessons authored by Richard Boleslavsky. Since he hadn't completed his junior high study, his English was poor. Nevertheless, he was very diligent. He did the translation relying on an English dictionary, and then double-checked the original book using a Russian-English dictionary and corrected any mistakes. After that, his English had greatly improved. He was also the first one who introduced the performing system of Constantin Stanislavski into China. Stanislavski's works were all written in Russian; Zheng thus found an English-Russian & Russian-English dictionary and translated Russian to Chinese through English. His translation of An Actor Prepares of Stanislavski, co-authored by Zhang Min, was the first systematic work on art performing in plays in China.

Zheng also authored the book Art History of World's Movies. At the time when no one in China dared to break ideological shackle and compare films of the western world with ones of the Soviet Union, it was a breakthrough by Zheng to write a chronicle of world films from a universal perspective.

Selected filmography

As director

As actor

See also
Cai Chusheng, frequent collaborator
Sun Yu, director of many films Zheng acted

References

External links
 
 Zheng Junli by the Chinese Movie Database
 Crows and Sparrows (1949), full film with English subtitles, on the Chinese Film Classics website
 New Women (1935), full film with English subtitles, on the Chinese Film Classics website
 Spring River Flows East (1947), full two-part film with English subtitles, on the Chinese Film Classics website
 The Great Road (1934), full film with English subtitles, on the Chinese Film Classics website
 Volcanic Passions (1932), full film with English subtitles, on the Chinese Film Classics website 
 Analysis of The Spring River Flows East (includes a short biography of Zheng)

1911 births
1969 deaths
Chinese male silent film actors
Film directors from Shanghai
Male actors from Shanghai
People persecuted to death during the Cultural Revolution
20th-century Chinese male actors
Chinese male film actors